Konda Vishweshwar Reddy (born 26 February 1960) is an Indian engineer, entrepreneur, and politician. He served as a Member of Parliament in the 16th Lok Sabha from Telangana Rashtra Samithi representing Chevella, Telangana. He is the grandson of K. V. Ranga Reddy after whom the district Ranga Reddy was named.

Reddy is the only Parliamentarian from India to be granted a US patent while serving as a Member of Parliament. He is the richest politician from Telangana with declared assets of worth 528 crore in 2014 and 895 crore in 2019 according to his election affidavit. He is married to Sangita Reddy, daughter of Apollo Hospitals founder Prathap C. Reddy.

In 2018, Reddy joined the Indian National Congress and resigned in March 2021.

Early life
Vishweshwar Reddy was born on 26 February 1960 in Hyderabad, then Andhra Pradesh, India to Jayalatha and Konda Madhava Reddy, Former Chief Justice of Andhra Pradesh and Maharashtra. His paternal grandfather was a Telangana freedom fighter and Deputy Chief Minister of Andhra Pradesh, Konda Venkata Ranga Reddy.

Reddy is completed his B.E. (Electrical engineering) from the University of Madras. He has a master's degree from the New Jersey Institute of Technology, US.

Career
As an engineer by profession, Reddy had worked as an adjunct faculty in the New Jersey Institute of Technology, N.J. and Essex County College, Newark. He is a successful software entrepreneur; he founded Citadel Research & Solutions, a company involved in engineering research and development. He was involved in the creations of several IPRs. As a professional, he worked for General Electric as the CEO and managing director of GE MSIT and as the CEO and managing director Wipro HCIT Wipro.

Recognitions 

 Granted US Patent on "Transfer Belt Mechanism Associated with Patient Transfer Gurney System (India & US)"

Political career
Reddy joined politics in 2013 on invitation from K. Chandrashekar Rao, President of Telangana Rashtra Samithi (TRS) Party. Further, he won the Member of Parliament seat from Chevella Lok Sabha constituency in 2014 General Elections by over a margin of 75,000 votes.

Reddy resigned from Telangana Rashtra Samithi in November 2018 and joined Indian National Congress in the presence of Sonia Gandhi and Rahul Gandhi. He later resigned Congress party in March 2021.Now he is in Bharatiya Janata Party

Policy influence 

 Convener of WASH Legislative Forum of Parliamentarians. WASH stands for Water, Sanitation and Hygiene. WASH-LF is supported by UNICEF working of various issues related to sanitation.
 Convener of Parliamentarians' Group for Children to UNICEF India

Personal life
He is married to Sangita Reddy, Managing Director, Apollo Hospitals. He has three sons including Anindith.

References

External links 

Telangana Rashtra Samithi politicians
Politicians from Hyderabad, India
Telangana politicians
India MPs 2014–2019
Lok Sabha members from Telangana
1960 births
People from Ranga Reddy district
Living people
Indian National Congress politicians from Telangana